Hajji Yuseflu may refer to:
 Hajji Yuseflu-ye Olya
 Hajji Yuseflu-ye Sofla